Baturasay, also known as Bayturasay, (Baiturasai, بايتۋراساي; , Bayturasay) is a town in Aktobe Region, west Kazakhstan.

References

Aktobe Region
Cities and towns in Kazakhstan